ISIL is the Islamic State of Iraq and the Levant (self-styled "Islamic State"), a militant Islamic group operating primarily in Iraq and Syria.

ISIL or Isil may also refer to:

Identifiers
 International Standard Identifier for Libraries and Related Organizations, a standard for identifying organizations

Organizations
 International Society for Individual Liberty, a libertarian educational organization based in the United States
 Indian Society of International Law, an institution for the teaching, research and promotion of International Law in India

Other uses
 Işıl, a feminine Turkish given name
  Information Structure Identification Language, based on GML

See also
 ISIL-KP, or the Islamic State of Iraq and the Levant – Khorasan Province, an offshoot of the ISIL operating primarily in Afghanistan and South Asia